The Street People was an R&B/disco group from New Jersey who first began recording in 1974. They were produced by Ray Dahrouge, and initially recorded for Spring Records, but their first single flopped. After switching to Vigor Records, they released a full-length self-titled album in 1976 and had several hit singles on the US Billboard R&B chart.

Members
Roy Daniels
Milton Daniels
Thomas "Toot" Williams
Joe Gardner
Rick Johnson
Clark Pitman

Singles

References

American disco groups
Musical groups from New Jersey